The Innsbrucker Hut is a mountain hut in the Stubai Alps at an altitude of  in the Gschnitz Valley, not far from the Pinnisjoch. It is managed by the Innsbruck Tourist Club section of the Austrian Alpine Club. The Innsbrucker Hütte is below the Habicht on the Stubai Hohenweg and is often visited.

Access 

An alternate route from Neder in the Stubai Valley (at ) through the Pinnis Valley takes approximately 4–5 hours and passes four former Alpine pastures, the Herzebenalm, Issenangeralm, Pinnisalm and Karalm. It is possible to take a taxi as far as the Karalm (at ).

Further destinations 
 The Bremer Hut is 6–7 hours from the Innsbrucker Hüttein 6 bis 7 Stunden
 The Elfer Hut is 3–4 hours away via the Pinnisjoch and the panorama path, or via the Elferspitze

Summits 
The following summits may be reached from the hut:
Habicht (3,277 m), 3 hrs, difficult
Glättespitze (3,133 m), 3.5 hrs, difficult
Kalkwand (2,564 m), 1 hr, intermediate
Ilmspitze (2,692 m) with medium-difficult klettersteig, 2.75 hrs, difficult (rated C/D)

Accommodation 
The hut offers the following accommodation:
 30 multi-bed room bedspaces
 70 mattress bedspaces

References

External links 
 Official website
 Climb to the Innsbrucker Hut via the Pinnis valley
 Innsbrucker Hut im Historischen Alpenarchiv der Alpenvereine in Deutschland, Österreich und Südtirol.

Mountain huts in Tyrol (state)